Eye of the Hurricane is a 1989 film by the Iranian director Masoud Jafari Jozani. The film was set during World War II, during the occupation of Iran by the Allied Army. It stars actors Ezzatolah Entezami, Majid Mozaffari, Ataollah Zahed, and Ahmad Hashemi. The film won the Crystal Simorgh for best film at the Fajr International Film Festival.

References

External link 
 

1980s Persian-language films
Iranian war drama films
1989 films
Crystal Simorgh for Best Film winners
World War II films